Mount Saraceno is a mountain on the Adriatic sea within the territory of Mattinata in Apulia, Italy. It is an important site with a necropolis of at least 400 graves dug in the rocks by Daunians in the 9th century BC.

References

Mountains of Italy